Ishaq b. Isma'il b. Shuab al-Tiflisi  (before 833 – 853), also known as Sahak in Georgian sources, was the emir of Tbilisi between 833 and 853. Under his rule, the emirate reached the apex of its power. He forced Georgian princes to pay tribute from Kakheti to Abkhazia. He tried to become independent from the Abbasid caliphate, stopped reversing the tribute, and allied himself with local nobility such as the mtavari of Kakheti. In retribution, the caliph Al-Mutawakkil sent an expedition against him led by Bugha al-Kabir (also known in Georgia as Bugha the Turk), assisted by the Georgian noble Bagrationi family. In 853, they burnt and sacked Tbilisi, and killed the emir.

References
Suny, Ronald Grigor (1994), The Making of the Georgian Nation: 2nd edition, p. 30. Indiana University Press, 

9th-century rulers in Asia
Islam in Georgia (country)
Monarchs killed in action
Year of birth unknown
853 deaths
Vassal rulers of the Abbasid Caliphate
Year of birth uncertain
9th-century Arabs